Francisco Augusto Lora González (1910–1993), was a vice president of the Dominican Republic and presidential candidate in 1966, 1970, 1974 and 1978. As vice-president, he was a member of President Joaquín Balaguer's Reformist Party (PR). When Balaguer threatened to leave the PR in 1970 and campaign outside of the organization, Augusto Lora was effectively forced out of the party and went on to become the leader of and ultimately the candidate for a new political party, the Movement for Democratic Integration against Reelection (MIDA).

Lora was descended from Basilio Fondeur, a Frenchman, brother of Colonel Furcy Fondeur.

References

Page with year of birth and year of death                       

1910 births
1993 deaths
Ambassadors of the Dominican Republic to the United States
Dominican Republic people of Spanish descent
Dominican Republic people of French descent
Social Christian Reformist Party politicians
Vice presidents of the Dominican Republic
White Dominicans